Sulayman Bojang (born 3 September 1997) is a professional footballer who plays for Skeid. Born in Norway, he represents Gambia internationally.

Career
On 13 August 2018, Sarpsborg 08 announced the signing of Bojang, from Skeid on a 3.5-year contract.

International career
In June 2019, Bojang was selected for the Gambian national football team and got his debut for the country on 8 June 2019 against Guinea, which they won 1-0 with Bojang on the left back for the whole game. He played his second game four days later against Morocco.

Career statistics

References

1997 births
Living people
Footballers from Oslo
People with acquired Gambian citizenship
Gambian footballers
The Gambia international footballers
Norwegian footballers
Norwegian people of Gambian descent
Association football defenders
Skeid Fotball players
Sarpsborg 08 FF players
Kongsvinger IL Toppfotball players
Eliteserien players
Norwegian First Division players
Norwegian Second Division players